Chuang Chia-Fu (born 1934, also known as Zhuang Jiafu), is a male former international table tennis player from China.

Table tennis career
He won a bronze medal at the 1957 World Table Tennis Championships in the Swaythling Cup (men's team event) with Hu Ping-chuan, Chiang Yung-Ning, Wang Chuanyao and Fu Chi Fong for China.

He later became a coach and worked for the All China Sports Federation.

See also
 List of table tennis players
 List of World Table Tennis Championships medalists

References

Chinese male table tennis players
1934 births
Living people
Table tennis players from Guangzhou
World Table Tennis Championships medalists